The 2007 season of the Belize Premier Football League, otherwise known as the RFG Insurance Cup, began on February 25, 2007 and concluded on June 10, 2007. FC Belize of Belize City won a twelve team league.

Final league tables

Group A

Group B

Results and fixtures 
Round 1
February 25: 
 Wagiya 2-0 Toledo, Verdes 4-0 Belmopan, FC Belize 2-0 Tex Mar (Group A)
 CDS Nairi's 1-1 Alpha, Juventus 2-0 Pickstock, Santel's 1-1 Conquerors (Group B)

Top level Belizean football league seasons
1
Bel